The Diplomatic Immunities (Conferences with Commonwealth Countries and Republic of Ireland) Act 1961 (c.11) was an Act of the Parliament of the United Kingdom that extended diplomatic immunity to representatives of British Dominions and the Republic of Ireland. It was repealed by the International Organisations Act 1981.

Act
The Act extends to representatives of the British Commonwealth and the Republic of Ireland the same diplomatic rights as those of representatives of other foreign states. Those representatives on official business have immunity from prosecution within British courts and any other immunity "granted by any enactment and rule of law or custom" to foreign representatives, and the same right is extended to those members of their staff who are citizens of a foreign nation. Those members of staff who are British are entitled only to immunity for "things done or omitted to be done in the course of the performance of their duties".

References

Bibliography

United Kingdom Acts of Parliament 1961
Repealed United Kingdom Acts of Parliament
Ireland and the Commonwealth of Nations